This is a list of the Goldie & Bear episodes aired by Disney Junior. The first season has been released, while the second season has also released as well.

In 2018, Disney Junior cancelled the series, and the series finale aired on October 1.
In Continued reruns to October 2, 2018 & October 22, 2019

Series overview
{|class="wikitable plainrowheaders" style="text-align:center;"
!colspan="2" rowspan="2"|Season
!rowspan="2"|Segments
!rowspan="2"|Episodes
!colspan="2"|Originally aired
|-
!First aired
!Last aired
|-
|style="background:#800080;"|
|1
|43
|22
|
|
|-
|style="background:#0000EE;"|
||2
|45
|23
|
|
|}

Episodes

Season 1 (2015–16)
 Goldie Locks and Jack Bear were present in all episodes in this season.
 Little Red Riding Hood was absent from 21 episodes: "Big Bear", "Tiny Tale", "Abraca Cabbage", "Goose Sitters", "Pinocchio-itis", "The Clubhouse that Jack Built", "The Egg", "Golden Kickball", "Thumbelina's Wild Ride", "Big Bad House Guest", "A Fish Tale", "The Troll Tamer", "When the Gnome is Away", "Training of the Broom", "Giant Among Us", "The Tooth About Jack and Jill", "Topsy Turvy Tea Party", "Fairy Fly Adventure", "Sing Froggy Sing", "Forget Me Lots" and "Jack of All Trades".

Season 2 (2017–18)
 Goldie Locks and Jack Bear were present in all episodes in this season.
 Little Red Riding Hood was absent from 22 episodes: "Goldie's Great Adventure", "If the Slipper Fits", "Little Coach Horner", "Fairy Godmother Gets Grounded", "Hark! A Snark!", "Gnome Family Reunion", "Big Bad's Secret", "Goldie's Do-Over Day", "Bunny Trouble", "Humpty's Big Hike", "Mary, Mary", "Humpty Cracks the Case", "Horsin' Around", "Billy the Kid", "Crystal Clear", "The Humongous Harvest of Hugeness", "Team Tiny", "The Wolf Who Cried Wolf", "Goin' Overboard", "Mr. Pail", "Viva Don Huevo!" and "Tess the Giantess".

References

Lists of American children's animated television series episodes